The Zaubererjackl trials or Salzburg witch trials, also known in history as the Magician Jackls process, which took place in the city of Salzburg in 1675–1690, was one of the largest and most famous witch trials in Austria. It led to the execution of 139 people. It was an unusual witch trial, as the majority of its victims were of male gender.

Background 
In 1675, Barbara Kollerin was put on trial for theft and sorcery in Salzburg together with one Paul Kalthenpacher. During torture, she confessed that her son, Paul Jacob Koller, had a pact with Satan. Her partner, Kaltenbacher, confirmed this and described Jacob as a man of 20, the son of an executioner's assistant. Barbara was to have taught him the "profession" of begging, theft and fraud. Barbara Kollerin was executed in August 1675. The authorities issued a warrant for the arrest of her son. He became known as Wizard Jackl or Magician Jackl or Jäckel.

The Jackl trial 
In 1677, the government said to have received the news that Jackl was dead. They had arrested the beggar boy Dionysos Feldner, a handicapped 12-year-old who was called "Dirty animal", and who was to have had contact with Jackl three weeks earlier. The boy confessed that Jackl was the leader of gangs of poor beggar-children and teenagers from the slum, whom he taught black magic. This led to mass arrests of homeless children and teenagers. The hysteria spread to the entire archbishopric.

During the interrogations of the captive beggar-teenagers, the confessions of the prisoners lead to more and more myths about Jackl. He was claimed to be able to make himself invisible and enchant mice and rats, which ruined the harvests of the farmers. He was portrayed as a murderer and the rumors eventually made him so cruel that the officials preferred to avoid capturing him. He was the most famous wizard in the city's history, but he was never captured himself. The witch trial, on the other hand developed into a great hunt of beggars, homeless and poor children and teenagers. Especially gangs were targeted. Many were accused of having caused some of the bad weather from the previous years.

Executions 
139 people were executed as the followers of Jackl in this trial; 39 were children (between 10 and 14 years old), 53 were teenagers and young adults (between 15 and 21), 21 of unknown age; 113 were of male gender; everyone except two were beggars. The youngest was Hannerl, 10 years old, and the oldest was Margarethe Reinberg, 80 years old. 109 were executed during 1681. They were tortured and burned; some of them alive, others after having been hanged or decapitated - some of them after having had their hands cut off and marked with burning iron.

References 

 http://www.wurzelwerk.at/thema/eswareinmal15.php
 https://web.archive.org/web/20081015200622/http://www.henker-folter.de/18.html
 http://www.historicum.net/themen/hexenforschung/thementexte/magisterarbeiten/art/Kindermund_tut/html/ca/b3d2705b48/
 Norbert Schindler: Rebellion, Community and Custom in Early Modern Germany

Witch trials in Austria
1675 in law
17th century in Austria
History of Salzburg

de:Zauberbubenprozesse in Salzburg